The United Nations Climate Change Conferences are yearly conferences held in the framework of the United Nations Framework Convention on Climate Change (UNFCCC). They serve as the formal meeting of the UNFCCC parties (Conference of the Parties, COP) to assess progress in dealing with climate change, and beginning in the mid-1990s, to negotiate the Kyoto Protocol to establish legally binding obligations for developed countries to reduce their greenhouse gas emissions. Starting in 2005 the conferences have also served as the "Conference of the Parties Serving as the Meeting of Parties to the Kyoto Protocol" (CMP); also parties to the convention that are not parties to the protocol can participate in protocol-related meetings as observers. From 2011 to 2015 the meetings were used to negotiate the Paris Agreement as part of the Durban platform, which created a general path towards climate action. Any final text of a COP must  be agreed by consensus.

The first UN Climate Change Conference was held in 1995 in Berlin.

1995: COP 1, Berlin, Germany 
The first UNFCCC Conference of the Parties took place from 28 March to 7 April 1995 in Berlin, Germany.

1996: COP 2, Geneva, Switzerland 
COP 2 took place from 8–19 July 1996 in Geneva, Switzerland. Its ministerial declaration was noted (but not adopted) on 18 July 1996, and reflected a United States position statement presented by Timothy Wirth, former Under Secretary for Global Affairs for the United States Department of State at that meeting, which:

 Accepted the scientific findings on climate change proffered by the Intergovernmental Panel on Climate Change (IPCC) in its second assessment (1995);
 Rejected uniform "harmonized policies" in favor of flexibility;
 Called for "legally binding mid-term targets".

1997: COP 3, Kyoto, Japan 
COP 3 took place on 1-11 December 1997 in Kyoto, Japan. After intensive negotiations, it adopted the Kyoto Protocol, which outlined the greenhouse gas emissions reduction obligation for Annex I countries, along with what came to be known as Kyoto mechanisms such as emissions trading, clean development mechanism and joint implementation. In a separate decision of the Conference of Parties, countries agreed to a range of national security exemptions which stated that bunker fuels and emissions from multilateral military operations would not be part of national emissions totals and would be reported outside of those totals. Most industrialized countries and some central European economies in transition (all defined as Annex B countries) agreed to legally binding reductions in greenhouse gas emissions of an average of 6 to 8% below 1990 levels between the years 2008–2012, defined as the first emissions budget period. The United States would be required to reduce its total emissions an average of 7% below 1990 levels; however Congress did not ratify the treaty after Clinton signed it. The Bush administration explicitly rejected the protocol in 2001.

1998: COP 4, Buenos Aires, Argentina 

COP 4 took place on 2-14 November 1998 in Buenos Aires, Argentina. It had been expected that the remaining issues unresolved in Kyoto would be finalized at this meeting. However, the complexity and difficulty of finding agreement on these issues proved insurmountable, and instead the parties adopted a two-year "Plan of Action" to advance efforts and to devise mechanisms for implementing the Kyoto Protocol, to be completed by 2000. During COP4, Argentina and Kazakhstan expressed their commitment to take on the greenhouse gas emissions reduction obligation, the first two non-Annex countries to do so.

1999: COP 5, Bonn, Germany 
COP 5 took place between 25 October and 5 November 1999, in Bonn, Germany. It was primarily a technical meeting, and did not reach major conclusions.

2000: COP 6, The Hague, Netherlands 
COP 6 took place on 13–25 November 2000, in The Hague, Netherlands. The discussions evolved rapidly into a high-level negotiation over the major political issues. These included major controversy over the United States' proposal to allow credit for carbon "sinks" in forests and agricultural lands that would satisfy a major proportion of the U.S. emissions reductions in this way; disagreements over consequences for non-compliance by countries that did not meet their emission reduction targets; and difficulties in resolving how developing countries could obtain financial assistance to deal with adverse effects of climate change and meet their obligations to plan for measuring and possibly reducing greenhouse gas emissions. 

In the final hours of COP 6, despite some compromises agreed between the United States and some EU countries, notably the United Kingdom, the EU countries as a whole, led by Denmark and Germany, rejected the compromise positions, and the talks in The Hague collapsed. Jan Pronk, the President of COP 6, suspended COP-6 without agreement, with the expectation that negotiations would later resume. It was later announced that the COP 6 meetings (termed "COP 6 bis") would be resumed in Bonn, Germany, in the second half of July. The next regularly scheduled meeting of the parties to the UNFCCC, COP 7, had been set for Marrakech, Morocco, in October–November 2001.

2001: COP 6, Bonn, Germany 
COP 6 negotiations resumed on 17–27 July 2001, in Bonn, Germany, with little progress having been made in resolving the differences that had produced an impasse in The Hague. However, this meeting took place after George W. Bush had become the President of the United States and had rejected the Kyoto Protocol in March 2001; as a result the United States delegation to this meeting declined to participate in the negotiations related to the Protocol and chose to take the role of observer at the meeting. As the other parties negotiated the key issues, agreement was reached on most of the major political issues, to the surprise of most observers, given the low expectations that preceded the meeting. The agreements included:

 Flexible mechanisms: The "flexibility mechanisms" which the United States had strongly favored when the Protocol was initially put together, including emissions trading, joint implementation (JI), and the Clean Development Mechanism (CDM) which allows industrialized countries to fund emissions reduction activities in developing countries as an alternative to domestic emission reductions. One of the key elements of this agreement was that there would be no quantitative limit on the credit a country could claim from use of these mechanisms provided domestic action constituted a significant element of the efforts of each Annex B country to meet their targets.
 Carbon sinks: It was agreed that credit would be granted for broad activities that absorb carbon from the atmosphere or store it, including forest and cropland management, and re-vegetation, with no over-all cap on the amount of credit that a country could claim for sinks activities. In the case of forest management, an Appendix Z establishes country-specific caps for each Annex I country. Thus, a cap of 13 million tons could be credited to Japan (which represents about 4% of its base-year emissions). For cropland management, countries could receive credit only for carbon sequestration increases above 1990 levels.
 Compliance: Final action on compliance procedures and mechanisms that would address non-compliance with Protocol provisions was deferred to COP 7, but included broad outlines of consequences for failing to meet emissions targets that would include a requirement to "make up" shortfalls at 1.3 tons to 1, suspension of the right to sell credits for surplus emissions reductions, and a required compliance action plan for those not meeting their targets.
 Financing: There was agreement on the establishment of three new funds to provide assistance for needs associated with climate change: (1) a fund for climate change that supports a series of climate measures; (2) a least-developed-country fund to support National Adaptation Programs of Action; and (3) a Kyoto Protocol adaptation fund supported by a CDM levy and voluntary contributions.

A number of operational details attendant upon these decisions remained to be negotiated and agreed upon, and these were the major issues considered by the COP 7 meeting that followed.

2001: COP 7, Marrakech, Morocco 

At the COP 7 meeting in Marrakech, Morocco, from 29 October to 10 November 2001, negotiators wrapped up the work on the Buenos Aires Plan of Action, finalizing most of the operational details and setting the stage for nations to ratify the Kyoto Protocol. The completed package of decisions is known as the Marrakech Accords. The United States delegation maintained its observer role, declining to participate actively in the negotiations. Other parties continued to express hope that the United States would re-engage in the process at some point and worked to achieve ratification of the Kyoto Protocol by the requisite number of countries to bring it into force (55 countries needed to ratify it, including those accounting for 55% of developed-country emissions of carbon dioxide in 1990). The date of the World Summit on Sustainable Development (August–September 2002) was put forward as a target to bring the Kyoto Protocol into force. The World Summit on Sustainable Development (WSSD) was to be held in Johannesburg, South Africa.

The main decisions at COP 7 included:

 Operational rules for international emissions trading among parties to the Protocol and for the CDM and joint implementation;
 A compliance regime that outlined consequences for failure to meet emissions targets but deferred to the parties to the Protocol, once it came into force, the decision on whether those consequences would be legally binding;
 Accounting procedures for the flexibility mechanisms;
 A decision to consider at COP 8 how to achieve a review of the adequacy of commitments that might lead to discussions on future commitments by developing countries.

2002: COP 8, New Delhi, India 

Taking place from 23 October to 1 November 2002, in New Delhi COP 8 adopted the Delhi Ministerial Declaration that, amongst others, called for efforts by developed countries to transfer technology and minimize the impact of climate change on developing countries. It is also approved the New Delhi work programme on Article 6 of the Convention. The COP8 was marked by Russia's hesitation, stating that it needed more time to think it over. The Kyoto Protocol could enter into force once it was ratified by 55 countries, including countries responsible for 55 per cent of the developed world's 1990 carbon dioxide emissions. With the United States (36.1 per cent share of developed-world carbon dioxide) and Australia refusing ratification, Russia's agreement (17% of global emissions in 1990) was required to meet the ratification criteria and therefore Russia could delay the process.

2003: COP 9, Milan, Italy 

COP 9 took place on 1–12 December 2003 in Milan, Italy. The parties agreed to use the Adaptation Fund established at COP7 in 2001 primarily in supporting developing countries better adapt to climate change. The fund would also be used for capacity-building through technology transfer. At COP9, the parties also agreed to review the first national reports submitted by 110 non-Annex I countries.

2004: COP 10, Buenos Aires, Argentina 

COP 10 took place on 6–17 December 2004.
COP10 discussed the progress made since the first Conference of the Parties 10 years ago and its future challenges, with special emphasis on climate change mitigation and adaptation. To promote developing countries better adapt to climate change, the Buenos Aires Plan of Action was adopted. The parties also began discussing the post-Kyoto mechanism, on how to allocate emission reduction obligation following 2012, when the first commitment period ends.

2005: COP 11/CMP 1, Montreal, Canada 

COP 11/CMP 1 took place between 28 November and 9 December 2005, in Montreal, Quebec, Canada. It was the first Conference of the Parties serving as the Meeting of the Parties to the Kyoto Protocol (CMP 1) since their initial meeting in Kyoto in 1997. It was one of the largest intergovernmental conferences on climate change ever. The event marked the entry into force of the Kyoto Protocol. Hosting more than 10,000 delegates, it was one of Canada's largest international events ever and the largest gathering in Montreal since Expo 67. The Montreal Action Plan was an agreement to "extend the life of the Kyoto Protocol beyond its 2012 expiration date and negotiate deeper cuts in greenhouse-gas emissions". Canada's environment minister at the time, Stéphane Dion, said the agreement provides a "map for the future".

2006: COP 12/CMP 2, Nairobi, Kenya 

COP 12/CMP 2 took place on 6–17 November 2006 in Nairobi, Kenya. At the meeting, BBC reporter Richard Black coined the phrase "climate tourists" to describe some delegates who attended "to see Africa, take snaps of the wildlife, the poor, dying African children and women". Black also noted that due to delegates concerns over economic costs and possible losses of competitiveness, the majority of the discussions avoided any mention of reducing emissions. Black concluded that was a disconnect between the political process and the scientific imperative. Despite such criticism, certain strides were made at COP12, including in the areas of support for developing countries and clean development mechanism. The parties adopted a five-year plan of work to support climate change adaptation by developing countries, and agreed on the procedures and modalities for the Adaptation Fund. They also agreed to improve the projects for clean development mechanism.

2007: COP 13/CMP 3, Bali, Indonesia 

COP 13/CMP 3 took place on 3–15 December 2007, at Nusa Dua, in Bali, Indonesia. Agreement on a timeline and structured negotiation on the post-2012 framework (the end of the first commitment period of the Kyoto Protocol) was achieved with the adoption of the Bali Action Plan (Decision 1/CP.13). The Ad Hoc Working Group on Long-term Cooperative Action under the Convention (AWG-LCA) was established as a new subsidiary body to conduct the negotiations aimed at urgently enhancing the implementation of the Convention up to and beyond 2012. Decision 9/CP.13 is an Amended to the New Delhi work programme. These negotiations took place during 2008 (leading to COP 14/CMP 4 in Poznan, Poland) and 2009 (leading to COP 15/CMP 5 in Copenhagen).

2008: COP 14/CMP 4, Poznań, Poland 

COP 14/CMP 4 took place on 1–12 December 2008 in Poznań, Poland. Delegates agreed on principles for the financing of a fund to help the poorest nations cope with the effects of climate change and they approved a mechanism to incorporate forest protection into the efforts of the international community to combat climate change.

Negotiations on a successor to the Kyoto Protocol were the primary focus of the conference.

2009: COP 15/CMP 5, Copenhagen, Denmark 

COP 15 took place in Copenhagen, Denmark, on 7–18 December 2009.
The overall goal for the COP 15/CMP 5 United Nations Climate Change Conference in Denmark was to establish an ambitious global climate agreement for the period from 2012 when the first commitment period under the Kyoto Protocol expires. However, on 14 November 2009, the New York Times announced that "President Obama and other world leaders have decided to put off the difficult task of reaching a climate change agreement... agreeing instead to make it the mission of the Copenhagen conference to reach a less specific "politically binding" agreement that would punt the most difficult issues into the future". Ministers and officials from 192 countries took part in the Copenhagen meeting and in addition there were participants from a large number of civil society organizations. As many Annex 1 industrialized countries are now reluctant to fulfill commitments under the Kyoto Protocol, a large part of the diplomatic work that lays the foundation for a post-Kyoto agreement was undertaken up to the COP15.

The conference did not achieve a binding agreement for long-term action. A 13-paragraph 'political accord' was negotiated by approximately 25 parties including US and China, but it was only 'noted' by the COP as it is considered an external document, not negotiated within the UNFCCC process. The accord was notable in that it referred to a collective commitment by developed countries for new and additional resources, including forestry and investments through international institutions, that will approach US$30 billion for the period 2010–2012. Longer-term options on climate financing mentioned in the accord are being discussed within the UN Secretary General's High Level Advisory Group on Climate Financing, which is due to report in November 2010. The negotiations on extending the Kyoto Protocol had unresolved issues as did the negotiations on a framework for long-term cooperative action. The working groups on these tracks to the negotiations are now due to report to COP 16 and CMP 6 in Mexico.

2010: COP 16/CMP 6, Cancún, Mexico 

COP 16 was held in Cancún, Mexico, from 28 November to 10 December 2010.

The outcome of the summit was an agreement adopted by the states' parties that called for the US$100 billion per annum "Green Climate Fund", and a "Climate Technology Centre" and network. However the funding of the Green Climate Fund was not agreed upon. Nor was a commitment to a second period of the Kyoto Protocol agreed upon, but it was concluded that the base year shall be 1990 and the global warming potentials shall be those provided by the IPCC.

All parties "Recognizing that climate change represents an urgent and potentially irreversible threat to human societies and the planet, and thus requires to be urgently addressed by all Parties". It recognizes the IPCC Fourth Assessment Report goal of a maximum 2 °C global warming and all parties should take urgent action to meet this goal. It also agreed upon greenhouse gas emissions should peak as soon as possible, but recognizing that the time frame for peaking will be longer in developing countries, since social and economic development and poverty eradication are the first and overriding priorities of developing countries.

2011: COP 17/CMP 7, Durban, South Africa 

The 2011 COP 17 was held in Durban, South Africa, from 28 November to 9 December 2011.

The conference agreed to a start negotiations on a legally binding deal comprising all countries, to be adopted in 2015, governing the period post 2020. There was also progress regarding the creation of a Green Climate Fund (GCF) for which a management framework was adopted. The fund is to distribute US$100 billion per year to help poor countries adapt to climate impacts.

While the president of the conference, Maite Nkoana-Mashabane, declared it a success, scientists and environmental groups warned that the deal was not sufficient to avoid global warming beyond 2°C as more urgent action is needed.

2012: COP 18/CMP 8, Doha, Qatar 

Qatar hosted COP 18 which took place in Doha, Qatar, from 26 November to 7 December 2012.
The Conference produced a package of documents collectively titled The Doha Climate Gateway. The documents collectively contained:
 The Doha Amendment to the Kyoto Protocol (to be accepted before entering into force) featuring a second commitment period running from 2012 until 2020 limited in scope to 15% of the global carbon dioxide emissions due to the lack of commitments of Japan, Russia, Belarus, Ukraine, New Zealand (nor the United States and Canada, who are not parties to the Protocol in that period) and due to the fact that developing countries like China (the world's largest emitter), India and Brazil are not subject to emissions reductions under the Kyoto Protocol.
 Language on loss and damage, formalized for the first time in the conference documents.

The conference made little progress towards the funding of the Green Climate Fund.

Russia, Belarus and Ukraine objected at the end of the session, as they had a right to under the session's rules. In closing the conference, the President said that he would note these objections in his final report.

2013: COP 19/CMP 9, Warsaw, Poland 

COP 19 was the 19th yearly session of the Conference of the Parties (COP) to the 1992 United Nations Framework Convention on Climate Change (UNFCCC) and the 9th session of the Meeting of the Parties (CMP) to the 1997 Kyoto Protocol (the protocol having been developed under the UNFCCC's charter). The conference was held in Warsaw, Poland from 11 to 23 November 2013. The most prominent result was the adoption of the Warsaw Framework for REDD-plus.

2014: COP 20/CMP 10, Lima, Peru 

On 1–12 December 2014, Lima, Peru, hosted the 20th yearly session of the Conference of the Parties (COP) to the 1992 United Nations Framework Convention on Climate Change (UNFCCC) and the 10th session of the Meeting of the Parties (CMP) to the 1997 Kyoto Protocol (the protocol having been developed under the UNFCCC's charter). The pre-COP conference was held in Venezuela.

2015: COP 21/CMP 11, Paris, France 

The COP 21 was held in Paris from 30 November to 12 December 2015. Negotiations resulted in the adoption of the Paris Agreement on 12 December, governing climate change reduction measures from 2020. The adoption of this agreement ended the work of the Durban platform, established during COP17. The agreement will enter into force (and thus become fully effective) on 4 November 2016. On 4 October 2016 the threshold for adoption was reached with over 55 countries representing at least 55% of the world's greenhouse gas emissions ratifying the Agreement.

2016: COP 22/CMP 12/CMA 1, Marrakech, Morocco 

COP 22 was held in Marrakech, in the North African country of Morocco, on 7–18 November 2016.
A focal issue of COP 22 is that of water scarcity, water cleanliness, and water-related sustainability, a major problem in the developing world, including many African states. Prior to the event a special initiative on water was presided by Charafat Afailal, Morocco's Minister in Charge of Water and Aziz Mekouar, COP 22 Ambassador for Multilateral Negotiations. Another focal issue was the need to reduce greenhouse emissions and utilize low-carbon energy sources. Peter Thomson, President of the UN General Assembly, called for the transformation of the global economy in all sectors to achieve a low emissions global economy.

2017: COP 23/CMP 13/CMA 1–2, Bonn, Germany 

COP 23 was held on 6–17 November 2017. On Friday, 18 November 2016, the end of COP 22, the Chairperson of COP 23 from Fiji announced that it would be held in Bonn, Germany. (COP 23/CMP 13).

Fijian Prime Minister and incoming President of COP 23, Frank Bainimarama, on 13 April launched the logo for this year's United Nations Climate Change Conference, to be held at UN Campus, Bonn in November.

2018: COP 24/CMP 14/CMA 1–3, Katowice, Poland 

COP 24 was held on 3–14 December 2018 in Katowice, Poland.

The Polish government's vision for presidency states that the organisation of COP 24 will provide an opportunity for convincing other countries that Poland does not hamper the process of tackling dangerous climate change and that Poland is one of the leaders of this process.

2019: SB50, Bonn, Germany 
The Climate Change Conference of UNFCCC Subsidiary Bodies was convened in Bonn, Germany, from 17 to 27 June 2019.

2019: COP 25/CMP 15/CMA 2, Madrid, Spain

The 25th session of the Conference of the Parties (COP 25) to the UNFCCC was planned to take place from 11 to 22 November 2019 in Brazil. Upon election as President of Brazil, Jair Bolsonaro withdrew Brazil from hosting the event.

COP 25 was then planned to take place in Parque Bicentenario Cerrillos in Santiago de Chile, Chile from 2 to 13 December with a pre-sessional period from 26 November to 1 December 2019 with up to 25,000 delegates scheduled to attend. However, following the 2019 Chilean protests, Chilean President Sebastián Piñera announced Chile's withdrawal from hosting the summit in late October 2019. UN Climate Change Executive Secretary Patricia Espinosa stated that organizers were "exploring alternative hosting options". Then Spain offered, and was appointed, as the new host.

2021: COP 26/CMP 16/CMA 3, Glasgow, United Kingdom 

COP 26 was originally scheduled to take place from 9 to 19 November 2020, in Glasgow, United Kingdom, but was postponed to 31 October to 12 November 2021 due to the COVID-19 pandemic.

2022: COP 27/CMP 17/CMA 4, Sharm El Sheikh, Egypt 

COP 27 was originally expected to take place in November 2021, but was moved to 2022 due to the rescheduling of COP 26 from 2020 to 2021. It took place in Sharm El Sheikh, Egypt.

2023: COP 28/CMP 18/CMA 5, Dubai, UAE 

COP 28 will take place in the United Arab Emirates. The summit will be held at Expo City Dubai from November 30th until December 12th, 2023.

https://www.cop28.com/en/

2024: COP 29, TBC 
In 2022, Australia announced plans to host COP 29 along with its Pacific island neighbours, and discussed this at the Pacific Islands Forum.

Bulgaria also expressed its desire to host COP 29.  President Rumen Radev presented Bulgaria's candidacy to host the UN international forum in 2024. This happened at the Climate Change Conference in Egypt.

2025: COP 30, TBC 
In 2022, during his statement at COP 27, elected-president Lula said he would seek to make Brazil the host of COP 30 in 2025 and would aim to put the venue in one of the country's Amazon states (most of them in the north region), rather than the more populous coastal region. This would be the first time that Brazil, which is home to 60% of the Amazon Rainforest, the world's largest intact forest, hosts the event. On 11 January 2023, President Lula and the Ministry of Foreign Affairs announced the city of Belém in the state of Pará as the host city of the event.

Summary of Events

See also

 United Nations Framework Convention on Climate Change
 Action for Climate Empowerment
 Global Climate Action Summit
2019 UN Climate Action Summit

References